Defending champion Björn Borg successfully defended his title, defeating Víctor Pecci Sr. 6–3, 6–1, 6–7(6–8), 6–4 in the final to win the men's singles tennis title at the 1979 French Open.

Seeds
The seeded players are listed below. Björn Borg is the champion; others show the round in which they were eliminated.

  Björn Borg (champion)
  Jimmy Connors (semifinals)
  Guillermo Vilas (quarterfinals)
  Vitas Gerulaitis (semifinals)
 n/a
  Harold Solomon (fourth round)
  Eddie Dibbs (quarterfinals)
  José Higueras (quarterfinals)
  Arthur Ashe (third round)
  Brian Gottfried (third round)
  José Luis Clerc (second round)
  Wojtek Fibak (fourth round)
  Manuel Orantes (fourth round)
  Tim Gullikson (fourth round)
  Corrado Barazzutti (third round)
  Adriano Panatta (third round)

Draw

Key
 Q = Qualifier
 WC = Wild card
 LL = Lucky loser
 r = Retired

Finals

Section 1

Section 2

Section 3

Section 4

Section 5

Section 6

Section 7

Section 8

External links
 Association of Tennis Professionals (ATP) – 1979 French Open Men's Singles draw
1979 French Open – Men's draws and results at the International Tennis Federation

Men's Singles
1979
1979 Grand Prix (tennis)